Lithia water is defined as a type of mineral water characterized by the presence of lithium salts (such as the carbonate, chloride, or citrate of lithium). Natural lithia mineral spring waters are rare, and there are few commercially bottled lithia water products.

Between the 1880s and World War I, the consumption of bottled lithia mineral water was popular. One of the first commercially sold lithia waters in the United States was bottled at Lithia Springs, Georgia, in 1888. During this era, there was such a demand for lithia water that there was a proliferation of bottled lithia water products. However, only a few were natural lithia spring waters. Most of the bottled lithia water brands added lithium bicarbonate to spring water and called it lithia water. With the start of World War I and the formation of the new US government food safety agency, mineral water bottlers were under scrutiny. The new agency posted large fines against mineral water bottlers for mislabeled, misrepresented and adulterated products. These government actions and their publicity, along with public works that made clean tap water readily accessible, caused the American public to lose confidence and interest in bottled mineral water.

Lithia water contains various lithium salts, including lithium citrate. An early version of Coca-Cola available in pharmacies' soda fountains called Lithia Coke was a mixture of Coca-Cola syrup and Bowden lithia spring water. The soft drink 7Up was named "Bib-Label Lithiated Lemon-Lime Soda" when it was formulated in 1929 because it contained lithium citrate. The beverage was a patent medicine marketed as a cure for hangover. Lithium citrate was removed from 7Up in 1948.

Notable brands
Lithia Spring Water, a brand of bottled natural lithia water sourced from Lithia Springs, Georgia, USA, since 1888
Londonderry Lithia, a brand of bottled lithia water produced during the late 19th and early 20th centuries
Buffalo Lithia Water, a brand of bottled lithia water sourced from Buffalo Lithia Springs, Virginia
Gerolsteiner, a natural sparkling water that lists 0.13 ppm lithium in its analysis

See also
Ashland, Oregon, where lithia water is piped to a public water fountain established as an attempt to draw tourists during the lithia water heyday.

References

 
Drinking water
Lithium
Mineral water
Alternative medical treatments